Thomas Kay Stuart Sidey  (8 October 1908 – 28 October 2007) was a former New Zealand politician who served as Mayor of Dunedin.

Biography

Early life and career
Born in 1908, he was brought up in Corstorphine House. He was the only child of Sir Thomas Sidey, a Dunedin Member of Parliament, cabinet minister and lawyer. Sidey was a lawyer, educated at Otago Boys' High School and the University of Otago. He was on the Otago University Council for 34 years. In World War II he was a Major in the New Zealand Army in the Pacific. He ran the Wickliffe Press in Dunedin and bred racehorses.

He married Beryl Thomas in 1933; they had one son (Dr. Tom Sidey, 1934–2016) and one daughter.

Political career
Sidey was Mayor of Dunedin from 1959 to 1965 for the Citizens Association, and was a member of the Dunedin City Council from 1947 to 1983.

In the 1968 Queen's Birthday Honours, Sidey was appointed a Companion of the Order of St Michael and St George, for services to the community, especially to local government.

References

1908 births
2007 deaths
20th-century New Zealand lawyers
New Zealand military personnel of World War II
Mayors of Dunedin
New Zealand racehorse owners and breeders
University of Otago alumni
People educated at Otago Boys' High School
New Zealand Companions of the Order of St Michael and St George
Local politicians in New Zealand
New Zealand Army officers
Dunedin City Councillors
Unsuccessful candidates in the 1946 New Zealand general election
Unsuccessful candidates in the 1938 New Zealand general election
Unsuccessful candidates in the 1935 New Zealand general election
New Zealand National Party politicians
Chancellors of the University of Otago